Pit Inn may refer to:

Pit Inn (jazz club), in Tokyo
Pit Inn (album), a 1974 Cedar Walton recording made at the above club